Park Sa-rang (born March 4, 2003) is a South Korean actress. Park began her career as a child actress, and has starred in television series and films such as A Happy Woman (2007), Bestseller (2010) and Grand Prix (2010).

Filmography

Film

Television series

Awards and nominations

References

External links 
 Park Sa-rang Fan Cafe at Daum 
 
 
 
 

2003 births
Living people
South Korean child actresses
South Korean film actresses
South Korean television actresses